Daniel Bernard "The Sandman" Christison (born April 26, 1972) is a retired American mixed martial artist. A professional from 2001 until 2010, he fought for the San Jose Razorclaws of the International Fight League, the Ultimate Fighting Championship, WEC, and was also a cast member on the second season of The Ultimate Fighter as part of Team Hughes. He is the former WEC Super Heavyweight Champion.

Background

Christison was born and raised in Los Angeles, California and had a rough upbringing which fueled his interest to begin mixed martial arts. He studied traditional Chinese martial arts before learning Brazilian jiu-jitsu and then transitioned into mixed martial arts.  He can claim both Hispanic and Native American ancestry.

Mixed martial arts career
At 6'8" and 265 lbs, Christison was a Heavyweight who fought chiefly with a submission wrestling style.  Christison fought out of Albuquerque, New Mexico.  Christison became a contestant on the second season of The Ultimate Fighter after Kerry Schall was forced to withdraw due to injury (Christison's dramatic submission win over Ben Rothwell at Euphoria 3 in Atlantic City on February 26, 2005 is widely cited as the reason for Christison being chosen to replace Schall).  Nicknamed "Big Dan" (a nickname given to him by Dana White during the show) Christison and Dan "The Sandman" Christison, he lost his first fight on the show, a quarterfinal match with Seth Petruzelli in which Christison lost by unanimous decision after he had inadvertently kicked Petruzelli twice in the groin area.

Christison was member of Team Hughes on TUF 2. Along with fellow former Ultimate Fighter competitors Keith Jardine, Joe Stevenson and Rashad Evans, he trained in Albuquerque under the instruction of coach Greg Jackson.

Christison was 0-6 lifetime in fights that went to a decision (not counting the loss to Petruzelli which is officially classed as an exhibition bout) and 20-1 in fights that were decided by knockout or submission (the lone loss coming via a doctor stoppage).

Christison and his wife, the former Kyria McBrayer, have (as of March 2023) a 12-year-old son, (John) Rylan.  The family resides in Dale, Indiana, near where Mrs. Christison was born and raised.

Championships and accomplishments
Ultimate Fighting Championship
Fight of the Night (One time) vs. Brad Imes 
Submission of the Night (One time) vs. Brad Imes

Mixed martial arts record

|-
| Win
| align=center| 20–7
| Mike Wessel
| Submission (kimura)
| CFC 4: Wessel vs. Christison
| 
| align=center| 3
| align=center| 3:56
| Winnipeg, Manitoba, Canada
| 
|-
| Win
| align=center| 19–7
| Rodrigo Munduruca
| KO (punches)
| Canadian Fighting Championship 3
| 
| align=center| 2
| align=center| 0:18
| Winnipeg, Manitoba, Canada
| 
|-
| Win
| align=center| 18–7
| Jim Davis
| TKO (submission to punches)
| ICF: Intimidation Cage Fighting 17
| 
| align=center| 1
| align=center| 2:21
| Florence, Kentucky, United States
| 
|-
| Win
| align=center| 17–7
| Joel Traves
| TKO (punches)
| Steele Cage MMA: Battle of the Texas Titans
| 
| align=center| 1
| align=center| 2:16
| Frisco, Texas, United States
| 
|-
| Loss
| align=center| 16–7
| Márcio Cruz
| Decision (unanimous)
| ICF: Breakout
| 
| align=center| 3
| align=center| 5:00
| Cincinnati, Ohio, United States
| 
|-
| Win
| align=center| 16–6
| Brion Peoples
| TKO (submission to punches)
| ICF: Turfwar
| 
| align=center| 1
| align=center| 0:36
| Florence, Kentucky, United States
| 
|-
| Win
| align=center| 15–6
| Steve Banks
| Submission (omoplata)
| Intimidation Cage Fighting: Redemption
| 
| align=center| 1
| align=center| 4:29
| Florence, Kentucky, United States
| 
|-
| Win
| align=center| 14–6
| Nedius Huitt
| TKO (submission to punches)
| ICF: Vendetta
| 
| align=center| 1
| align=center| 0:45
| Florence, Kentucky, United States
| 
|-
| Win
| align=center| 13–6
| Charles McVey
| KO (punches)
| Warrior MMA: Consequences
| 
| align=center| 1
| align=center| 1:46
| Elizabethtown, Kentucky, United States
| 
|-
| Win
| align=center| 12–6
| Sam Holloway
| Submission (armbar)
| AFL: Bulletproof
| 
| align=center| 1
| align=center| 0:50
| Atlanta, Georgia, United States
| 
|-
| Win
| align=center| 11–6
| John LeBlanc
| TKO (punches)
| AFL: Eruption
| 
| align=center| 2
| align=center| 4:02
| Lexington, Kentucky, United States
| 
|-
| Win
| align=center| 10–6
| Derek Sawyer
| TKO (punches)
| RFL: Revolution Fight League I
| 
| align=center| 1
| align=center| 0:50
| Louisville, Kentucky, United States
| 
|-
| Win
| align=center| 9–6
| Johnathon Wesson
| Decision (unanimous)
| RITC 103: USA vs Brazil
| 
| align=center| 3
| align=center| 4:00
| Fountain Hills, Arizona, United States
| 
|-
| Loss
| align=center| 8–6
| Antoine Jaoude
| Decision (unanimous)
| IFL: Chicago
| 
| align=center| 3
| align=center| 4:00
| Chicago, Illinois, United States
| 
|-
| Loss
| align=center| 8–5
| Krzysztof Soszynski
| Decision (unanimous)
| IFL: Los Angeles
| 
| align=center| 3
| align=center| 4:00
| Los Angeles, California, United States
| 
|-
| Loss
| align=center| 8–4
| Frank Mir
| Decision (unanimous)
| UFC 61: Bitter Rivals
| 
| align=center| 3
| align=center| 5:00
| Las Vegas, Nevada, United States
| 
|-
| Win
| align=center| 8–3
| Brad Imes
| Submission (armbar)
| UFC Fight Night 4
| 
| align=center| 3
| align=center| 3:37
| Las Vegas, Nevada, United States
| <small>Fight of the Night and Submission of the Night.
|-
| Win
| align=center| 7–3
| Jimmy Ambriz
| Submission (verbal)
| IFC WC 19: Warriors Challenge 19
| 
| align=center| 2
| align=center| 0:55
| Sault Ste. Marie, Michigan, United States
| 
|-
| Win
| align=center| 6–3
| Ben Rothwell
| Submission (kimura)
| Euphoria: USA vs World
| 
| align=center| 3
| align=center| 0:57
| Atlantic City, New Jersey, United States
| 
|-
| Win
| align=center| 5–3
| Andre Roberts
| Submission (armbar)
| WEC 13
| 
| align=center| 1
| align=center| 3:26
| Lemoore, California, United States
|<small>Won the vacant WEC Super Heavyweight Championship.
|-
| Win
| align=center| 4–3
| Lemuel Vincent
| TKO (strikes)
| KOTC: New Mexico
| 
| align=center| N/A
| align=center| N/A
| Albuquerque, New Mexico
| 
|-
| Win
| align=center| 3–3
| Jimmy Westfall
| TKO (punches)
| POA: Pride of Albuquerque
| 
| align=center| 1
| align=center| 1:18
| Albuquerque, New Mexico
| 
|-
| Loss
| align=center| 2–3
| Dan Severn
| Decision (split)
| KOTC 24: Mayhem
| 
| align=center| 3
| align=center| 5:00
| Albuquerque, New Mexico
| 
|-
| Loss
| align=center| 2–2
| Eric Pele
| TKO (strikes)
| KOTC 23: Sin City
| 
| align=center| 1
| align=center| 4:50
| Las Vegas, Nevada, United States
|For the KOTC Super Heavyweight Championship.
|-
| Win
| align=center| 2–1
| Albert Lopez
| Submission (rear-naked choke)
| Triple Threat: Fight Night 1
| 
| align=center| 1
| align=center| N/A
| Albuquerque, New Mexico
| 
|-
| Loss
| align=center| 1–1
| Dan Severn
| Decision
| AC 1: Aztec Challenge 1
| 
| align=center| 3
| align=center| 5:00
| Ciudad Juarez, Mexico
| 
|-
| Win
| align=center| 1–0
| Gabe Beauperthy
| Submission
| GC 5: Rumble in the Rockies
| 
| align=center| N/A
| align=center| N/A
| Denver, Colorado, United States
|

References

External links 
DanChristison.com

 

American male mixed martial artists
Mixed martial artists from California
Heavyweight mixed martial artists
Super heavyweight mixed martial artists
Mixed martial artists utilizing wushu
Mixed martial artists utilizing Brazilian jiu-jitsu
Living people
1972 births
Ultimate Fighting Championship male fighters
American wushu practitioners
American practitioners of Brazilian jiu-jitsu